Bifusella is a genus of fungi within the Rhytismataceae family. The genus contains 10 species.

References

External links
Bifusella at Index Fungorum

Leotiomycetes